The 1865 Vermont gubernatorial election took place on September 5, 1865. In keeping with the "Mountain Rule", incumbent Republican J. Gregory Smith, who had served two one-year terms, was not a candidate for reelection as governor of Vermont. With the election taking during the American Civil War, Dillingham ran as a pro-Union Republican. The Democratic nomination was won by Charles N. Davenport of Wilmington, an attorney and founder of the Brattleboro Reformer newspaper. In the general election, Dillingham was easily elected to a one-year term as governor.

Results

References

Vermont
1865
Gubernatorial
September 1865 events